Provodov-Šonov is a municipality in Náchod District in the Hradec Králové Region of the Czech Republic. It has about 1,200 inhabitants. Part of Rozkoš Reservoir lies in the municipality.

Administrative parts
The municipality is made up of village of Kleny, Provodov, Šeřeč, Šonov u Nového Města nad Metují and Václavice.

References

Villages in Náchod District